This is a list of fictional universes in literature.

See also
 List of science fiction universes

References

Universes